Kaldeh may refer to:
 Kaldeh, Astaneh-ye Ashrafiyeh
 Kaldeh, Fuman